Blaha Lujza tér is a station of the M2 (East-West) line of the Budapest Metro.
It is a major transport junction.  Tram numbers 4 and 6 (the boulevard lines, going south-west) stop here as do Express Buses 7 red (Piros 7) and 173. The station was open on 2 April 1970 as part of the inaugural section of Line M2, between Deák Ferenc tér and Örs vezér tere.

The square is named after Lujza Blaha, an actress (1850–1926). The Hungarian National Theater was located on the square until 1964 when it was demolished (by explosion) because of the subway construction.

The 111-year-old New York Café is located at walking distance from it. It was renovated and re-opened in 2006 May by the Italian hotel chain Boscolo Hotels Inc.

Connections
 Tram
4 Széll Kálmán tér – Újbuda-központ
6 Széll Kálmán tér – Móricz Zsigmond körtér
28 Blaha Lujza tér (Népszínház utca) – Izraelita temető
28A Blaha Lujza tér (Népszínház utca) – Új köztemető (Kozma utca)
37 Blaha Lujza tér (Népszínház utca) – Új köztemető (Kozma utca)
37A Blaha Lujza tér (Népszínház utca) – Sörgyár
62 Rákospalota, MÁV-telep – Blaha Lujza tér (Népszínház utca)
 Trolleybus
74 Csáktornya park – Károly körút (Astoria)
 Bus: 5, 7, 7E, 8E, 99, 107, 108E, 110, 112, 133E, 217E

Gallery

References

External links

M2 (Budapest Metro) stations
Railway stations opened in 1970